Juventud de Torremolinos Club de Fútbol is a Spanish football team based in Torremolinos, Málaga, in the autonomous community of Andalusia. Founded in 1958, it plays in Tercera División – Group 9, holding home matches at Estadio Municipal El Pozuelo.

Season to season

29 seasons in Tercera División

Current squad

Technical Staff

External links
 
La Preferente team profile 
ArefePedia team profile 
Soccerway team profile

Football clubs in Andalusia
Association football clubs established in 1958
1958 establishments in Spain
Torremolinos